Christopher Stephen Dale (born 15 December 1961) is an English former professional cricketer. Born at Canterbury in Kent, Dale was a spin bowler who played for Gloucestershire County Cricket Club and Kent County Cricket Club during the 1980s.

Cricketing career
Dale was vitally contracted by Kent County Cricket Club. He made his debut for the county's Second XI in 1979 and played for both Kent and Essex Second XI's until August 1983 when he joined Gloucestershire. He made his first-class cricket debut for Gloucestershire in May 1984 against Hampshire at County Ground, Southampton. Dale played eight times for Gloucestershire in the 1984 County Championship and three times in the 1984 John Player Special League.

During the 1985 season Dale played twice for Derbyshire County Cricket Club's Second XI before rejoining Kent at the beginning of the 1986 season. He made his Kent debut against the touring Indians in May 1986 before making two appearances for the county in the 1986 County Championship and one in the 1986 John Player Special League.

In local domestic cricket, Dale played for and sometimes captained St Lawrence and Highland for 25 years. He also played in Australia and qualified as an umpire. In 2015 he gave up his job in order to establish a cricket coaching business based in Canterbury.

References

External list

1961 births
Living people
Sportspeople from Canterbury
English cricketers
Gloucestershire cricketers
Kent cricketers